The Monument of the Holy Mother of God is a monument in Haskovo, a city in southeastern Bulgaria. The monument is dedicated to Mary, the mother of Jesus and was unveiled in 2003.

The Virgin Mary is the traditional patron saint of Haskovo. The Bulgarian National Revival-time Church of the Holy Mother of God, built from 1832 to 1837, was the first cathedral to be built in Haskovo in modern times. The feast of the Nativity of the Mother of God on 8 September has been celebrated as one of the most important holidays of that city. The earliest record of an organized celebration dates from 1896 and the feast was officially proclaimed the Day of Haskovo in 1993.

Construction of the Monument of the Holy Mother of God was approved by the Haskovo municipal council in September 2002. The required funding of 300,000 leva (€150,000) was secured thanks to donations by the citizens of Haskovo. 10,000 postcards were printed with the image of the future monument and were sold for 5 leva (€2.50) each, with the entire collected sum going for the construction. The Yamacha hill southwest of the city centre was chosen as the construction site so that the monument would be visible from the entire city even at night.

The statue of the Virgin Mary installed on the monument was the work of several sculptors, including Petyo Aleksandrov and Nikola Stoyanov; the material that was used was polymer concrete. The entire monument measures 80 tonnes in weight, while the statue itself weighs 20 tonnes. The monument's pedestal includes the small Bulgarian Orthodox Chapel of the Nativity of the Mother of God, the interior of which resembles an ancient church and features a stone altar. A large Christian cross relief on the front side of the pedestal points to the chapel entrance.

The Monument of the Holy Mother of God was unveiled on 8 September 2003 and consecrated by Arsenius, Metropolitan Bishop of Plovdiv. The monument's Guinness Book of World Records application was accepted and it was included in the 2004 edition of the book, as well as later editions. The monument quickly became one of the symbols of Haskovo, along with the medieval key on its coat of arms. Since 2009, it has also been included as No. 72 among the 100 Tourist Sites of Bulgaria. In 2010 a bell tower was constructed next to the statue of the Virgin Mary. With its height of close 30 meters, it is one of the highest bell tower on the Balkan Peninsula. 8 bells of varying sizes grace its belfry. The bell tower is open for tourists and its highest point has views of the town.

See also
List of tallest statues

References

External links

 Photo gallery of the Monument of the Holy Mother of God at the Haskovo Municipality website

Monuments and memorials in Bulgaria
Statues of the Madonna and Child
Christianity in Bulgaria
Buildings and structures in Haskovo Province
Buildings and structures completed in 2003
Colossal statues
Haskovo
Tourist attractions in Haskovo Province
Chapels in Bulgaria